Arnold Plumer (June 6, 1801 – April 28, 1869) was a member of the U.S. House of Representatives from Pennsylvania.

Life and career
Arnold Plumer was born near Cooperstown, Pennsylvania.  He was privately tutored at home and completed preparatory studies.  He served as sheriff of Venango County, Pennsylvania, in 1823 and prothonotary of the county in 1829 and clerk of the courts and recorder from 1830 to 1836.

Political career
Plumer was elected as a Democrat to the Twenty-fifth Congress.  He was appointed marshal of the United States District Court for the Western District of Pennsylvania by President Martin Van Buren on May 20, 1839, and served until May 6, 1841.  

He was elected to the Twenty-seventh Congress.  He was again appointed United States Marshal for the Western District of Pennsylvania on December 14, 1847, and served until April 3, 1848, when he resigned.  

He was State Treasurer of Pennsylvania in 1848.  He was a delegate to the 1860 Democratic National Convention.  He engaged in mining and banking enterprises and died in Franklin, Pennsylvania.  He was interred in Franklin Cemetery.

Sources

The Political Graveyard

1801 births
1869 deaths
United States Marshals
Democratic Party members of the United States House of Representatives from Pennsylvania
Pennsylvania prothonotaries
19th-century American politicians
Burials in Pennsylvania